Black Knight is a 2001 American fantasy adventure buddy comedy film directed by Gil Junger and starring Martin Lawrence. In addition to Lawrence, Black Knight had a supporting cast of Marsha Thomason, Tom Wilkinson, Vincent Regan, and Kevin Conway. In the film, Lawrence plays Jamal, a theme park employee who is transported through time to medieval England. The film was shot at various locations in North Carolina, mainly Wilmington and Carolina Beach. Black Knight was theatrically released on November 21, 2001 to negative reviews and grossed $39.9 million against a production budget of $50 million.

Plot

Jamal Walker is a slacker working at Medieval World theme park, which is about to have big competition from Castle World. While cleaning the park's moat, he tries to retrieve a medallion and gets sucked into 1328 England.

He first meets the drunkard Knolte, then finds what he believes is Castle World, so he goes to investigate. They believe he is a French Moor, from Normandy, as he tells them he is from Florence and Normandie, a famous intersection in LA.

Jamal is soon taken to King Leo, who assumes he is the Normandy messenger he's expecting to unite England and Normandy. He realizes it isn't a theme park after witnessing a beheading. Introducing himself as Jamal "Sky" Walker, his high school basketball nickname, he gains the king's trust by accidentally preventing his assassination, and is made a lord and head of security.

Jamal learns from Victoria, a chambermaid, that the king overthrew the former queen. Jamal, believing he can't help, tells her so. Debating with Victoria, who insists that his medallion deems him to be a man of honor, she leaves, frustrated with his cowardice. 

Later that night, Princess Regina, the king's daughter who is infatuated with Jamal, sneaks into his bed. He believes she is Victoria, so sleeps with her. The real Norman messenger arrives, seeking the Princess Regina's hand in marriage for his liege, so Jamal is exposed as a fraud. The infuriated king throws him into the dungeon to be executed.

In the dungeon, two failed assassins tell the tale of the Black Knight. He could not be bought or bribed, and fought for justice. He had been swallowed whole with a gold sword by a fierce dragon, so he cut himself from its belly and could himself breathe the fire of the dragon.

The three are brought forth for execution. As a last resort, Jamal claims to be a sorcerer and attempts to scare the superstitious onlookers to escape. As the executioner begins to choke on an apple, the crowd believes Jamal to have cast a spell of death upon him. In the commotion, he saves him with the Heimlich Maneuver. 

Using this distraction and flaming arrows fired from outside the walls, Jamal escapes the castle with Victoria and Knolte's aid. He learns that Knolte had been the former queen's knight who was disgraced when she lost her throne. Jamal soon understands he must help overthrow King Leo and help restore the queen to her throne.

With some effort, Jamal convinces the decimated rebels and townsfolk to overthrow the king together. Using modern-day tactics from American football and pro wrestling, he gives the peasants the means to fight the armed and armored king's guards. Out of gratitude, Knolte teaches Jamal some basic sword-fighting manoeuvres, and also tells him that he has an idea that may give them an advantage in the upcoming battle.

The next day, Knolte and the rebels storm the castle, only to be surrounded by guards and Leo's bodyguard, Percival. Seemingly outmatched, the rebels are pushed back. The tide turns briefly when the legendary Black Knight charges in, breathing fire and scattering the guards, but he falls from his horse and is revealed to be Jamal. 

Using their newfound skills, the peasants overpower the guards, but Knolte is severely wounded by Percival's longbow, who takes Victoria hostage. When a scared King Leo asks Percival for safety he, already seen as pathetic and weak, is killed by him and thrown into the moat. Charging to the rescue, Jamal surprises Percival with his fighting skills, knocking him out and rescuing Victoria. However, Percival comes to and is then shot dead by Knolte before he can kill Jamal. Jubilation abounds when the rebels realize victory is theirs.

After the queen's reign is restored, Jamal is knighted. During the dubbing, he awakes back at the Medieval World surrounded by his co-workers and a medical team, who saved him from drowning in the moat, implying that his entire adventure was a dream. Jamal's whole attitude changes from his experience, and he helps to improve Medieval World, so they won't go out of business. 

Later on, walking around the new Medieval World, Jamal meets Nicole, who looks just like Victoria. They talk a little, and he asks her out to lunch. Unfortunately, he forgets to get Nicole's number, and when he tries to catch up to her, he accidentally falls back into the moat, waking up in the Colosseum of Ancient Rome, where he is about to be devoured by lions.

Cast
 Martin Lawrence as Jamal Walker/"Skywalker"
 Marsha Thomason as Victoria the Chambermaid and Nicole
 Tom Wilkinson as Sir Knolte of Marlborough
 Kevin Conway as King Leo
 Vincent Regan as Percival
 Daryl Mitchell as Steve
 Michael Countryman as Phillip
 Jeannette Weegar as Princess Regina
 Erik Jensen as Derek
 Dikran Tulaine as Dennis
 Helen Carey as The Queen
 Robert Alan Harris as King Leo's Squire

Production

Development
The film was announced to release on November 21, 2001 by Fox.

Reception

Box office
The film opened at #4 at the U.S. box office on its opening weekend with $11.2 million. Black Knight grossed $39.9 million worldwide against a $50 million budget, making it a box office bomb.

Critical response
On Rotten Tomatoes, the film has an approval rating of 14% based on 98 reviews, with an average rating of 3.52/10. The site's consensus states, "Black Knight feels like a lazily constructed movie, filled with lame gags and constant mugging from Lawrence." The film has also drawn attention from scholars. Addressing it as one of the few contemporary films that cast African American characters in medieval settings, Laurie A. Finke and Martin B. Shichtman noted that the film provided commentary on early 21st-century race relations in the United States, noting that despite his triumphs in the medieval setting, by the end, Jamal "continues to live in white America, which requires hybridity, not dominance, from African American men. He may be a better man for his excellent medieval adventure, but he is still black, poor, underemployed, and living in the hood.”

Awards and nominations

Motion Picture Sound Editors 
 Nominated for Golden Reel Award for Best Sound Editing - Music - Feature Film, Domestic and Foreign

See also 
 A Spaceman in King Arthur's Court
 A Connecticut Yankee in King Arthur's Court
 A Kid in King Arthur's Court

References

External links
 
 
 
 
 
 Black Knight at Yahoo! Movies

2001 films
2000s adventure comedy films
American adventure comedy films
American fantasy comedy films
Films about time travel
20th Century Fox films
Regency Enterprises films
Films about rebellions
Films shot in North Carolina
Films set in amusement parks
Films set in castles
Films set in the 14th century
Films set in England
Films set in medieval England
Films directed by Gil Junger
Films scored by Randy Edelman
2000s fantasy comedy films
2001 comedy films
2000s English-language films
Films produced by Arnon Milchan
2000s American films